Frances A. Champagne is a Canadian psychologist and University Professor of Psychology at the University of Texas at Austin known for her research in the fields of molecular neuroscience, maternal behavior, and epigenetics. Research in the Champagne lab explores the developmental plasticity that occurs in response to environmental experiences.  She is known for her work on the epigenetic  transmission of maternal  behavior.  Frances Champagne's research has revealed how natural variations in maternal behavior can shape the behavioral development of offspring through epigenetic changes in gene expression in a brain region specific manner. She won the NIH Director's New Innovator Award in 2007 and the Frank A. Beach Young Investigator Award in Behavioral Neuroendocrinology in 2009. She has been described as the "bee's knees of neuroscience". She serves on the Committee on Fostering Healthy Mental, Emotional, and Behavioral Development Among Children and Youth in the United States.

Education and teaching 
Champagne received her B.A. degree in psychology at Queen's University, Canada. She attended graduate school at McGill University, Canada where she obtained both her M.Sc degree in Psychiatry and a PhD degree in Neuroscience where she studied under the mentorship of Michael Meaney. Champagne completed her postdoctoral research at the University of Cambridge in England, where she studied animal behavior. Champagne was hired as an assistant professor in the Department of Psychology at Columbia University in New York City in 2006. Upon tenure-review, she was promoted to Associate Profession, a position she remained until 2017. From 2016 to 2017, Dr. Champagne also served as the Vice Chair in the Department of Psychology. In 2017, she began her current tenure at University of Texas at Austin as a full professor in the Department of Psychology.  She maintains her affiliation with Columbia University as an adjunct associate professor within the department of psychology.  As a full professor, she teaches courses including but not limited to the developing brain, behavioral epigenetics and ethics, genetics and the brain.

Research 
Champagne's research has examined the neurobiology of the parental brain including neural mechanisms underlying individual differences in maternal behavior and the effects of the environment on these neural circuits. Another main research interest is the epigenetic effects of maternal behavior and how epigenetic variation emerge in response to variation in mother-infant interactions experienced during development. She also researches prenatal programming of offspring development and the impact of prenatal exposure to stress, toxins, or nutritional variation on placental and offspring brain gene expression. Paternal-maternal interplay and offspring development is another research main interest of Champagne and is the impact of fathers on mothers and offspring and the epigenetic mechanisms through which this interplay occurs. In addition, she is interested in exploring ways to ameliorate the negative effects of adverse prenatal and postnatal experiences on development by investigating the epigenetic mechanisms that allow offspring to overcome or be resilient to such early life experiences.

Champagne has investigated the epigenetic mechanisms via which individual variation in reproductive and social behavior can be induced via variation in early (prenatal and postnatal) life experiences.  She has explored the interplay between mothers and fathers in the development of offspring and transgenerational effects of early life experiences.

In her new Epigenetics, Development & Neuroscience Lab, she and her lab members explore the changes that can occur throughout development as a result of environmental conditions.  Most notably, the effect of prenatal exposure to bisphenols on mother and infant epigenetic and behavioral outcomes.  This work is funded through the National Institute on Environmental Health Sciences.  Bisphenols, including but not limited to Bisphenol A, otherwise known as BPA have previously been shown to be endocrine disrupting.

Additionally, she is a co-investigator continuing the Boricua Youth Study that began at Columbia University, a longitudinal study aimed at understanding the risks and protective factors that Puerto Rican youth experience.  This project is funded through the National Institute on Child Health Development.

Lastly and most recently, she served on the committee for the Parental Brain Conference in 2018, a meeting focused on the biological and behavioral perspectives in parental health during the summer of 2018.

Selected publications 

Champagne FA (2018) Epigenetic and Multigenerational Impact of Adversity. In Violence Against Children: Making Human Rights Real. Edited by: Lenzer G, Routledge. Abstract

Champagne FA (2016) Epigenetic legacy of parental experiences: Dynamic and interactive pathways to inheritance. Dev Psychopathol 28(4pt2):1219-1228. PMID 27687718

Stolzenberg D & Champagne FA (2016) Hormonal and Non-hormonal bases of maternal behavior: The role of experience and epigenetic mechanisms. Hormones & Behavior 77:204-10. PMID 26172856

Miller RL, Yana Z, Mahera C, Zhanga H, Gudsnuk K, McDonalde J, Champagne FA (2016) Impact of prenatal polycyclic aromatic hydrocarbon exposure on behavior, cortical gene expression, and DNA methylation of the Bdnf gene. Neuroepigenetics 5: 11–18. PMID 27088078

Jensen Peña C, Champagne FA (2015) Neonatal over-expression of estrogen receptor-α alters midbrain dopamine neuron development and reverses the effects of low maternal care in female offspring. Developmental Neurobiology 75(10):1114-24. PMID 25044746

Kundakovic M, Gudsnuk K, Herbstman JB, Tang D, Perera FP, Champagne FA (2015) DNA methylation of BDNF as a biomarker of early-life adversity. Proc Natl Acad Sci U S A 12(22):6807-13. PMID 25385582

Tost H, Champagne FA, Meyer-Lindenberg A (2015) Environmental influence in the brain, human welfare and mental health. Nature Neuroscience 18(10):1421-31.

PMID 26404717

Tang G, Gudsnuk K, Kuo SH, Cotrina M, Rosoklija G, Sosunov A, Sonders M, Kanter E, Castagna C, Yamamoto A, Yue Z, Arancio O, Peterson BS, Champagne FA, Dwork A, Goldman J, Sulzer D (2014) Loss of mTOR-dependent macroautophagy causes autistic-like synaptic pruning deficits. Neuron 83(5):1131-43. PMID 25155956

Champagne FA (2011) Maternal imprints and the origins of variation. Hormones & Behavior 60(1):4- 11. PMID 21376726

Gudsnuk KM, Champagne FA (2011) Epigenetic effects of early developmental experiences. Clinics in Perinatology 38(4):703-17.  PMID 22107899

Curley JP, Rock V, Moynihan AM, Bateson P, Keverne EB, Champagne FA (2010) Developmental shifts in the behavioral phenotypes of inbred mice: the role of postnatal and juvenile social experiences. Behavior Genetics 40(2):220-32. PMC2862468

Champagne FA (2010) Early adversity and developmental outcomes: Interaction between genetics, epigenetics and social experiences across the lifespan. Perspectives on Psychological Science 5(5) 564– 574. PMID 26162197

Champagne FA (2010) Epigenetic influence of social experiences across the lifespan. Developmental Psychobiology 52(4):299-311. PMID 20175106

Wan M, Kubinyi E, Miklósi A, Champagne FA (2009) A cross-cultural comparison of reports by German Shepherd Owners in Hungary and the United States of America. Applied Animal Behaviour Science 121: 206–213. Abstract.

Curley JP, Davidson S, Bateson P & Champagne FA (2009) Social enrichment during postnatal development induces transgenerational effects on emotional and reproductive behavior in mice. Frontiers in Behavioral Neuroscience 3:25 PMID 19826497

Champagne FA, Curley JP, Hasen N, Swaney WT & Keverne EB (2009) Paternal influence on female behavior: The role of Peg3 in exploration, olfaction and neuroendocrine regulation of maternal behavior of female mice. Behavioral Neuroscience 123(3):469-80. PMID 19485553

Curley JP, Jordan E, Swaney WT, Izrealit A, Kammel S & Champagne FA (2009) The meaning of weaning: Influence of the weaning period on behavioral development in mice. Developmental Neuroscience 31(4):318-31. PMID 19546569

Fagiolini M, Jensen CL, & Champagne FA (2009) Epigenetic influences on brain development and plasticity. Current Opinion in Neurobiology 19(2): 207–212. PMID 19545993

Champagne FA & Mashoodh R (2009) Genes in context: Gene-environment interplay and the origins of individual differences in behavior. Current Directions in Psychological Science 18(3): 127–131. PDF

Champagne FA (2009) Nurturing Nature: Social experiences and the brain. Journal of Neuroendocrinology 21(10):867-8. PMID 19686450

Champagne FA, Curley JP (2008) Maternal regulation of estrogen receptor alpha methylation. Current Opinion in Pharmacology 8(5): 963–73. PMID 18644464

Champagne FA (2008) Epigenetic mechanisms and the transgenerational effects of maternal care. Frontiers in Neuroendocrinology 29(3): 386–397. PMID 18462782

Champagne FA, Curley JP, Keverne EB, Bateson PPG (2007) Natural variations in postpartum maternal care in inbred and outbred mice. Physiology & Behavior 91(2-3):325-34. PMID 17477940

Champagne FA, Meaney MJ (2007) Transgenerational effects of social environment on variations in maternal care and behavioral response to novelty. Behavioral Neuroscience 121(6): 1353–63. PMID 18085888

Champagne FA, Weaver ICG, Diorio J, Szyf M, Meaney MJ (2006) Maternal care associated with methylation of the estrogen receptor alpha 1b promoter and estrogen receptor alpha expression in the medial preoptic area of female offspring. Endocrinology 147(6): 2909–2915. PMID 16513834

Champagne FA, Meaney MJ (2006) Stress during gestation alters maternal care and the development of offspring in a rodent model. Biological Psychiatry 59(12):1227-35. PMID 16457784

Champagne FA, Curley JP (2005) How social experiences influence the brain. Current Opinion in Neurobiology 15(6):704-9. PMID: 16260130

Champagne FA, Chretien P, Stevenson CW, Zhang TY, Gratton A, Meaney MJ (2004) Variations in nucleus accumbens dopamine associated with individual differences in maternal behavior in the rat. Journal of Neuroscience 24(17):4113-23. PMID 15115806

Champagne FA, Weaver IC, Diorio J, Sharma S, Meaney MJ (2003) Natural variations in maternal care are associated with estrogen receptor alpha expression and estrogen sensitivity in the medial preoptic area. Endocrinology 144(11):4720-4. PMID 12959970

Champagne F, Francis DD., Mar A, Meaney MJ (2003) Naturally-occurring variations in maternal care in the rat as a mediating influence for the effects of environment on the development of individual differences in stress reactivity. Physiology & Behavior 79:359-371. PMID 12954431

Champagne F, Diorio J, Sharma S, Meaney MJ (2001) Naturally occurring variations in maternal behavior in the rat are associated with differences in estrogen-inducible central oxytocin receptors. Proceedings of the National Academy of Sciences USA 98(22):12736-41. PMID 11606726

Champagne F, Meaney MJ (2001) Like mother, like daughter: evidence for non-genomic transmission of parental behavior and stress responsivity. Progress in Brain Research 133:287-302. PMID 11589138

Marshall WL, Anderson D, Champagne F (1997) Self-esteem and its relationship to sexual offending. Psychology Crime & Law 3(3): 161-186.

Awards 

 2012-2013 Lenfest Distinguished Faculty Award in Psychology, Columbia University in the City of New York. 
 2009 Frank A. Beach Young Investigator Award in Behavioral Neuroendocrinology. Hormones and Behavior, 2011, 60, 4-11.
 2007 NIH Director's New Innovator Awards. Project Title: Epigenetic Mechanism Mediating the Inheritance of Reproductive Behavior. Grant ID: DP2-OD001674

References

External links 
University of Texas at Austin: Faculty Profile Page
University of Texas at Austin: Epigenetics, Development & Neuroscience Lab
Parental Brain Conference

Year of birth missing (living people)
Living people
Canadian psychologists
Columbia University faculty
Queen's University at Kingston alumni
McGill University Faculty of Science alumni
Canadian neuroscientists
Canadian women neuroscientists
University of Texas at Austin faculty